Double Dose is the eighth album by the American blues rock band Hot Tuna, and their third live album.  The album was originally released as a double-LP as Grunt CYL2-2545. After their 1977 tour, Jorma Kaukonen moved on to a solo career and Jack Casady joined the new wave band SVT.  Hot Tuna would not perform together again until 1983.  The album had its highest peak at #92 on the Billboard charts.

The group recorded the album as a cost-saving alternative to a studio album. However the mixing process considerably raised the album's expense. Producer Felix Pappalardi heavily edited the concert tapes and had Kaukonen re-record his vocals for sides 2 through 4 at Wally Heider Studios.

Track listing
All tracks written by Jorma Kaukonen, except where noted.

Personnel

Side A
Jorma Kaukonen – vocals, acoustic guitar

Side B/C/D
Jorma Kaukonen – vocals, guitar
Jack Casady – bass
Nick Buck – keyboards, backup vocal on "Talking 'Bout You"
Bob Steeler - drums

Production
Felix Pappalardi – producer
Don Gehman – associate producer, engineer, mixdown engineer
Gail Collins – associate producer
Allen Sudduth – assistant engineer
Ray Thompson – location engineer
Dennis Hertzendorfer – assistant mixing engineer
Sheilah "Sam" Taylor – assistant mixing engineer
Recorded live by Wally Heider Recording at Theatre 1839, San Francisco
Additional recording at Wally Heider Studios, San Francisco
Mixed and assembled at Criteria Recording Studios, Miami
Mastered at Sterling Sound by George Marino

References

Albums produced by Don Gehman
Hot Tuna live albums
1978 live albums
Albums produced by Felix Pappalardi
Grunt Records albums